Johann Baptist Rudolph Kutschker (11 April 1810, Loučky – 27 January 1881, Vienna) was an Austrian Cardinal.

Life
Johann Rudolf Kutschker was born in Seifersdorf, Austrian Silesia (now Loučky in Zátor, Czech Republic). He studied humanities and philosophy at the Olomouc University then at the University of Vienna - doctorate in theology.

Ordained priest on 21 April 1833 and incardinated in the archdiocese of Olomouc, he became professor of moral theology of the local university for seventeen years. Later he was appointed to different higher posts in the period 1857–1876 in Vienna.

Kutschker was elected titular bishop of Carrhae and appointed auxiliary bishop of archdiocese of Vienna on 7 April 1862. Promoted to the metropolitan see of Vienna on 15 April 1876.

Archbishop Kutschker was created cardinal priest in the consistory of 22 June 1877 by Pope Pius IX and assigned to the title of Sant'Eusebio. He participated in the Papal conclave, 1878.

He died in Vienna on 27 January 1881 and was buried in the metropolitan St. Stephen's Cathedral, Vienna.

References

External links
 
 The Cardinals of the Holy Roman Church- Biographical Dictionary
 Catholic Hierarchy data for this cardinal 

1810 births
1881 deaths
People from Bruntál District
People from Austrian Silesia
Higher Scientific Institute for Diocesan Priests at St. Augustine's alumni
19th-century Austrian cardinals
Cardinals created by Pope Pius IX
Palacký University Olomouc alumni